The following is a timeline of the history of the city of Salamanca, Spain.

Prior to 20th century

 222 BCE - Forces of Carthaginian Hannibal take Salamanca from the Vettones.

 89 CE - Roman bridge of Salamanca rebuilt (approximate date).
 500-589 CE - Roman Catholic Diocese of Salamanca established.
 712 - Muslims in power.
 1055 - Muslims driven out.
 1102 - Christian Alfonso VI of León and Castile in power.
 12th century -  expanded.
 1208 - Fuero of Salmanaca (civil law) created (approximate date).
 1218 - University of Salamanca founded by Alfonso IX of León.
 1401 - University's Colegio Mayor de San Bartolomé, Salamanca established.
 1415 - University's  built.
 1481 - Printing press in use.
 1509 - New Cathedral of Salamanca construction begins.
 1538
 University's  construction begins.
 1590 - Population: 24,000.
 1600 - University's  built.
 1610 - Moriscos expelled.
 1651 - Population: 12,000.
 1667 -  (church) built.
 1734 - New Cathedral construction completed.
 1739 -  (church) rebuilt.
 1755 - 1 November: 1755 Lisbon earthquake.
 1756 - Plaza Mayor, Salamanca (square) constructed; designed by Andrés García de Quiñones.
 1812
 22 July: Battle of Salamanca fought near city; French defeated.
 Mirat factory in business.
 1842 - Population: 13,786.
 1887 - Population: 22,199.
 1900 - Population: 25,690.

20th century

 1905 - Café Novelty in business.
 1913 -  (bridge) built.
 1923 - UD Salamanca (football club) formed.
 1930 - Population: 46,867.
 1931 -  (archives) established.
 1946 - Salamanca Airport begins operating civilian flights.
 1970
 Helmántico Stadium opens.
 Population: 125,220.
 1973 -  (bridge) built.
 1983 - City becomes part of the autonomous community of Castile and León.
 1988 -  declared an UNESCO World Heritage Site.
 1991 - Population: 186,322.

21st century

 2011
 Alfonso Fernández Mañueco becomes mayor.
 Population: 151,658.
 2013 - Unionistas de Salamanca CF and Salamanca AC (football clubs) formed.

See also
 Salamanca history
 List of mayors of Salamanca (in Spanish)
 List of municipalities in Salamanca province
 Timelines of other cities in the autonomous community of Castile and León: Burgos, Valladolid

References

This article incorporates information from the Spanish Wikipedia.

Bibliography

in English

in Spanish
 
 
 
 1884 ed.

External links

 Items related to Salamanca, various dates (via Europeana)
 Items related to Salamanca, various dates (via Digital Public Library of America)

Salamanca
Salamanca